The 2012–13 Lebanese Premier League is the 52nd season of top-tier football in Lebanon. A total of twelve teams are competing in the league, with Safa the defending champions. The season kicked off on 28 September and finished on 16 June 2013, longer than usual, but due to the national team getting to the 2014 FIFA World Cup qualification – AFC Fourth Round.

Teams 
Al-Mabarrah and Al-Ahli Saida were relegated to the second level of Lebanese football after ending the 2011–12 season in the bottom two places. Promoted from the second level were Shabab Al-Ghazieh, after one season away from the top flight and Al Ijtima'ih Tripoli.

Stadia and locations

League table

References

2012–13 Lebanese Premier League
Lebanese Premier League seasons
Leb
1